Boris Tičić (born 22 May 1957) is a Croatian football defender and later manager.

Career
Tičić played for Orijent before joining local rivals Rijeka. He played for them in the famous home win over Real Madrid in the 1984–85 UEFA Cup as well as in the controversial away leg defeat.

References

External links
 

1957 births
Living people
Association football defenders
Yugoslav footballers
HNK Orijent players
HNK Rijeka players
Arminia Bielefeld players
2. Bundesliga players
Yugoslav expatriate footballers
Expatriate footballers in West Germany
Yugoslav expatriate sportspeople in West Germany
Croatian football managers
NK Zadar managers
NK Široki Brijeg managers
HNK Rijeka managers
Croatian Football League managers
Croatian expatriate football managers
Expatriate football managers in Bosnia and Herzegovina
Croatian expatriate sportspeople in Bosnia and Herzegovina